Frederick J. Moynihan was an American sculptor, born on the Isle of Guernsey in 1843. He died in his New York City studio on January 9, 1910.

Moynihan studied at the Royal Academy of Arts in London before immigrating to the United States.  He is best remembered for creating  monuments commemorating the American Civil War.

Public monuments

HMS Eurydice, Shanklin Cemetery, Shanklin, Isle of Wight 1880
Pennsylvania's Ninth "Lochiel" Veteran Cavalry Monument, Chickamauga and Chattanooga National Military Park, Fort Oglethorpe, Georgia 1894
Company F, 1st US (Vermont) Sharpshooters Monument - Gettysburg, PA 1889
Vermont Sharpshooters, Companies E & H 2nd Regiment United States Sharpshooters - Gettysburg, PA 1889
13th Vermont Infantry Monument Lieutenant Stephen F. Brown- Gettysburg, PA 1899
Georgia State Monument. Chickamauga and Chattanooga National Military Park, Fort Oglethorpe, Georgia 1899
Griffin Alexander Stedman Monument, Barry Square, Hartford, Connecticut, 1900
General Gustavus Sniper, equestrian, Syracuse, New York, 1905
J.E.B. Stuart, equestrian,  Monument Avenue, Richmond, Virginia, 1907

Gallery

Notes

References

DuPriest, Jr., James E. and Douglas O. Tice, Jr. Monument & Boulevard: Richmond's Grand Avenues, Richmond Discoveries, Richmond, Virginia, 1996
Falk, Peter Hastings, Editor, Who Was Who in American Art,  Sound View Press, Madison Connecticut, 1985
Hardin, Evemarie, Syracuse Landmarks: An AIA Guide to Downtown and Historic Neighborhoods, Syracuse University Press, Syracuse, New York,  1993
Kerr, Jack, Monuments and Markers of the 29 States Engaged at Chickamauga and Chattanooga, Collegedale, TN: The College Press, n.d.
Mackay, James, The Dictionary of Sculptors in Bronze, Antique Collectors Club,  Woodbridge, Suffolk  1977
Opitz, Glenn B, Editor, Mantle Fielding’s Dictionary of American Painters, Sculptors & Engravers,  Apollo Book, Poughkeepsie NY, 1986

19th-century American sculptors
1843 births
1910 deaths
British emigrants to the United States
20th-century American sculptors